Bowling railway station serves the village of Bowling in the West Dunbartonshire region of Scotland. This station is on the North Clyde Line, 12¼ miles (20 km) west of Glasgow Queen Street.

The station is managed by ScotRail who also provide the train service.  It was opened in 1858 by the Glasgow, Dumbarton and Helensburgh Railway, though Bowling had received its first railway several years earlier courtesy of the  Caledonian and Dumbartonshire Junction Railway (whose Bowling Pier terminal linked into the steamer service along the  River Clyde).

The station was made famous by a 1960 painting by the renowned railway artist, the late Terence Cuneo, who depicted a then new Blue train (Class 303) heading westbound into Bowling, passing a steam engine, which the 303 had replaced, in a siding. The painting was used as a poster 'Glasgow Electric'.

Accidents and incidents
On 8 September 1933, a passenger train collided with wagons on the line due to a signalman's error. Five people were injured.

Services

2006/07

2010/11

During the operation of the interim timetable until sufficient Class 380s had entered service, the eastbound service terminated at Airdrie.

2016
Sunday services run half-hourly to Balloch and to Glasgow Central Low Level (and thence alternately to Motherwell via Whifflet and to Larkhall).

References

Notes

Sources

External links
Video footage of Bowling Railway Station

Railway stations in West Dunbartonshire
SPT railway stations
Railway stations served by ScotRail
Railway stations in Great Britain opened in 1858
Former North British Railway stations